Rakeem Boyd is an American football running back who is a free agent. He played college football at Arkansas.

Early years
Boyd attended Stratford High School in Houston, Texas. During his high school career he rushed for 6,436 yards and 80 touchdowns. He committed to Texas A&M University to play college football.

College career
Boyd spent one year at Texas A&M before transferring to Independence Community College. In his one season at Independence, he rushed for 1,211 yards with 14 touchdowns. After the season he transferred to the University of Arkansas. During his first year at Arkansas in 2018, Boyd played in all 12 games and started the final eight. He finished the season with 734 yards on 123 carries with two touchdowns. As a junior in 2019, he started all 12 games, rushing for 1,133 yards on 184 carries and eight touchdowns. On December 1, 2020, he opted out of the remainder of his senior season and declared for the 2021 NFL Draft.

Professional career
Boyd signed with the Detroit Lions as an undrafted free agent on May 3, 2021. He was waived with an injury settlement on June 4.

Personal life
Boyd was featured in the third season of the Netflix documentary TV series, Last Chance U.

References

External links
Arkansas Razorbacks bio

Year of birth missing (living people)
Living people
Players of American football from Houston
American football running backs
Independence Pirates football players
Arkansas Razorbacks football players
Detroit Lions players